Paxson is an unincorporated community in Loudoun County, Virginia. Paxson lies south of Round Hill at the crossroads of Snickersville Turnpike (Virginia Secondary Route 734) and Yellow Schoolhouse Road.

Unincorporated communities in Loudoun County, Virginia
Washington metropolitan area
Unincorporated communities in Virginia